Jes M. Baker is an American writer, photographer, and activist, best known for being part of the body positive movement. She blogs as The Militant Baker. Her writing focuses on self-image, and topics range from body hair to rape culture. Baker founded the Body Love Conference, which held regional conferences in Arizona in 2014 and 2015.

Early life 
Baker was born in 1986, the eldest daughter of a large Mormon family. She went to college in Arizona and Idaho. After college, she worked as a pastry chef, a psych-social rehabilitation specialist, and a mental health educator at a company that provides job support to those with mental difficulties.

Career 
In March 2012 Baker began blogging, using the moniker The Militant Baker. Inspired by a body positive writer named Rachele who wrote a blog called The Nearsighted Owl. Baker's blog features posts on equality, recipes, body positive language, DIY, notes on self-acceptance, the feminist movement, and empowerment. In her blog, she explores the connection between self-esteem, body image and mental health.

In 2013, Baker helped create a series of images, using the phrase "Attractive and Fat". The images were a response to the advertisements of the clothing store Abercrombie and Fitch. Baker, who wears a size 22, changed the store's logo from A&F to "Attractive and Fat" in a mock ad, intended to challenge the  marketing strategies of the   store. Back in 2006, store CEO Mike Jeffries had publicly made a statement that only "cool kids" belonged in Abercrombie clothes, that the store was exclusively for those who were considered to be popular.  In May 2013, Baker wrote "I challenge the separation of attractive and fat, and I assert that they are compatible regardless of what you believe;" Following this, Jeffries issued an apology.

Baker's photo for The Adipositivity Project in 2013 was described by Bustle magazine as one of 'The Most Body Positive Photos From the Last 30 Years'. In 2014, she co-founded the Expose Project, which features views of bodies that don't conform to cultural stereotypes and standards of beauty.

In 2014 she gave a TEDx talk, explaining how body insecurity hinders personal and professional productivity:   "the way we view our bodies determines the way we participate in the world." In 2015, she coined the term "body currency" referring to how people devote their financial and mental energies  to make their exterior bodies perfect, at the cost of mental happiness.

In October 2015, her book Things No One Will Tell Fat Girls was published. The book includes short guest essays by Virgie Tovar, Sonya Renee Taylor, Andrew Walen, Jen McLellan, Shanna Katz Kattari, Kimberly A. Peace, Sam Dylan Finch, Bruce Sturgell, and Chrystal Bougon, who present  perspectives and experiences on topics like self-acceptance and unlearning patriarchal beauty standards. In addition, Baker shares personal experiences paired with  research.  To promote the book, Baker developed the hashtag #FatGirlsCan as a way for women to share videos and images of what activities they can participate in regardless of their body size. According to WorldCat, the book is held in 230 libraries

Baker was the October/November 2015 cover model for DailyVenusDiva.com. She also has written for publications like xoJane, Ravishly and Volup2.

Personal life 
Baker has discussed her struggles with depression as well as borderline personality disorder. She has over 20 tattoos, which she has said was a way for her to acknowledge the visibility of areas of her body, like her arms, which she struggled with.

She lives in Tucson, Arizona.

Works and publications

References

External links 
 The Militant Baker

1986 births
Living people
Body image in popular culture
Fat acceptance activists
People with borderline personality disorder
21st-century American women